= Houtkoppen =

- Location within Gauteng Location within South Africa
- Coordinates: 26.029°S 27.957°E
- Country: South Africa
- Province: Gauteng
- Municipality: City of Johannesburg
- Time zone: UTC+2 (SAST)

Houtkoppen is a suburb of Johannesburg, South Africa. It is located in Region A of the City of Johannesburg Metropolitan Municipality.
